Joan Tomàs Campasol (born 17 May 1985), known as Joan Tomàs, is a Spanish professional footballer who plays for Peralada. Mainly a left-winger, he can also operate as a striker.

Club career
Born in Girona, Catalonia, Joan Tomàs was an unsuccessful graduate from Espanyol's youth ranks, after which he moved to neighbours Lleida in the Segunda División B. After one season with Alicante in the same tier, which ended in promotion, he joined Villarreal.

Even though already 23, Joan Tomàs spent over a year registered with the B side, and made his first-team – and La Liga – debut on 1 February 2009, in a 3–0 away loss against Deportivo de La Coruña. During the 2008–09 campaign, also, he was one of the most important elements for the reserves as they eventually achieved a first-ever promotion to Segunda División.

In the summer of 2010, Joan Tomàs left Villarreal and signed for Celta of the second division. He contributed five goals in 37 matches in his second year, as the Galicians returned to the top flight after a five-year absence. He played just 24 minutes at the higher level, before he was released from his contract by mutual consent.

Joan Tomàs then joined AEK Larnaca of the Cypriot First Division, with whom he spent six years. In January 2019, he signed for Lamia of Super League Greece. On 28 February, he scored with a scuffed shot to beat Olympiacos goalkeeper Yury Lodygin in a 1–0 away win that qualified to the semi-finals of the Greek Football Cup 4–3 on aggregate. In July, he renewed his contract for one season.

Joan Tomàs moved countries again in late August 2019, with the 34-year-old signing with Liga 1 (Indonesia) club Persija Jakarta.

Career statistics

Honours
AEK Larnaca
Cypriot Cup: 2017–18
Cypriot Super Cup: 2018

Spain U19
UEFA European Under-19 Championship: 2004

References

External links

1985 births
Living people
Sportspeople from Girona
Spanish footballers
Footballers from Catalonia
Association football wingers
Association football forwards
La Liga players
Segunda División players
Segunda División B players
Tercera Federación players
RCD Espanyol B footballers
UE Lleida players
Alicante CF footballers
Villarreal CF B players
Villarreal CF players
RC Celta de Vigo players
CF Peralada players
Cypriot First Division players
AEK Larnaca FC players
Super League Greece players
PAS Lamia 1964 players
Liga 1 (Indonesia) players
Persija Jakarta players
Spain youth international footballers
Spanish expatriate footballers
Expatriate footballers in Cyprus
Expatriate footballers in Greece
Expatriate footballers in Indonesia
Spanish expatriate sportspeople in Cyprus
Spanish expatriate sportspeople in Greece
Spanish expatriate sportspeople in Indonesia